Neal A. Karlinsky (born October 14, 1968) was the Seattle correspondent for ABC News. He has been nominated twice for the 30th and 32nd News & Documentary Emmy Award in the Outstanding Continuing Coverage of a News Story category. Karlinsky received a nomination, in the Television Segment category at the 2012 James Beard Awards, where he hosted a cooking segment with John Berman, on Nightline.

He is now a Storyteller for Amazon.

Early life and education
Karlinsky was born, on October 14, 1968, in Detroit, Michigan,  the son of Arnold and Vivian Karlinsky (née, Monarch), and he was raised with a brother, Paul, and a sister, Deborah. He obtained his baccalaureate from Michigan State University in journalism.

Career
He started his journalism career at WLNS-TV in Lansing, Michigan, where he would eventually move to Nashville, Tennessee to WKRN-TV, while finally landing at KIRO-TV in Seattle, Washington. In August 2000, Karlinsky joined ABC News as a Seattle-based correspondent, where he has covered the 2008 Sichuan earthquake, garnering him a nomination at the  News & Documentary Emmy Award, for Outstanding Continuing Coverage of a News Story. This ongoing story appeared on ABC World News Tonight. John Berman and Karlinsky received a nomination for a cooking segment on Nightline, at the 2012 James Beard Awards, in the Television Segment category.

Personal life
He is married to Malia Karlinsky, an Emmy award winning Lifestyle Reporter and Producer at KOMO-TV, the ABC affiliate in Seattle.  They have two children.

References

External links
Adweek Story

1968 births
Living people
Television personalities from Detroit
ABC News personalities
Michigan State University alumni